Qaidi  is a 1984 Indian Hindi-language action film, produced by G. Hanumantha Rao by Padmalaya Studios, presented by Krishna and directed by S.S. Ravichandra. It stars Jeetendra, Shatrughan Sinha, Hema Malini, Madhavi and music composed by Bappi Lahiri. The film is remake of the Telugu film Khaidi (1983)  which itself was loosely based on the 1982 movie First Blood.

Plot 
Suraj lives in a small rural town in India with his widowed father, Yashpal, and a widowed sister, Sita. Suraj attends college, becomes a graduate and returns home to find that their family home is about to be auctioned at the behest of the cruel and influential Zamindar Bansilal, who refuses to allow them any more time to repay his outstanding loan. The auction takes place but is not enough to pay the loan, but Suraj assures them that he will do so when he gets a job in Bombay. Shortly thereafter, Yashpal kills himself; Sita is brutally killed, and an enraged Suraj tries to kill Bansilal, Sharma, and Raghu, he does manage to kill Raghu and Sharma, but Bansilal escapes and notifies the police, who locate, arrest Suraj, and have him sentenced to a long jail term. But Suraj escapes from prison and goes on the hunt for Bansilal. Before he could do that, he must first go through the police lines.

Cast 

Jeetendra as Suraj
Shatrughan Sinha as ASP Dinesh Jugran
Hema Malini as Dr. Sunita
Madhavi as Preeti
Vidya Sinha as Seeta
Ranjeet as Raghu
Shakti Kapoor as Sudarshanlal
Kader Khan as Bansilal
Asrani as Sharma
Bharat Bhushan as Yashpal
Urmila Bhatt as Mrs. Jugran (Dinesh's Mother)
Sujit Kumar as Police Inspector
Dev Kumar as Jagga
Silk Smitha as Dancer In Song "Baango Baango Baango"

Music 
The music of the film is composed by Bappi Lahiri and lyrics are penned by Indeevar.

References

External links 

1980s Hindi-language films
1984 films
Indian action films
1984 action films
Films scored by Bappi Lahiri
Hindi remakes of Telugu films
Films directed by S. S. Ravichandra